Pushpakumara Serasinghe (born 8 April 1963) is a Sri Lankan former first-class cricketer who played for Police Sports Club.

References

External links
 

1963 births
Living people
Sri Lankan cricketers
Sri Lanka Police Sports Club cricketers
Cricketers from Colombo